Nachindi Girl Friendu is a 2022 Indian Telugu-language action thriller film directed by Guru Pawan and starring Uday Shankar and Jennifer Emmanuel.

Cast 
Uday Shankar as Rajaram
Jennifer Emmanuel as Sandhya alias Sandy
Madhunandan as Cherry
Suman as Mukesh
Srikanth Iyengar as Krishna Pandey
Prudhviraj as Police inspector
Saurav Lokesh as Vikram Roy
Gayatri Bhargavi as  Rajaram's mother

Production 
Atluri Narayan Rao's English professor's son Uday Shankar was cast after Atluri Narayan Rao saw Uday Shankar's previous films.

Soundtrack 
The songs were composed by Gifton Elias.
"Manasa Manasa" - Karthik, Harika Narayan
"Erra Tholu Pilla" - Dhanunjay
"Dosth Ante Nuvve Ra"- Rahul Sipligunj

Reception 
A critic from The Times of India wrote that "Overall, Nachindi Girl Friendu, directed by Guru Pawan and featuring Uday Shankar and Jenifer Emmanuel, is a youthful, entertaining thriller if you can look past the rationale in some sequences". A critic from Sakshi Post wrote that "Nachindi Girl Friend is a suspense thriller film. Give it a shot!" A critic from 123telugu wrote that "On the whole, Nachindi Girl Friendu has a relevant topic, but the narration didn’t do justice to its potential. The director’s intention is clear, but the way things are presented hastily is a letdown". A critic from The Hans India wrote that "Director Gurupawan has made an effort to rethink the purpose of the daylong journey from Vizag to Bhimili. He adds tension and thriller elements to the love track, and he impressively moves the plot forward". A critic from NTV rated the film two out of five. A critic from Filmibeat rated the film  out of 5.

References 

2022 films
Indian thriller films
2020s Indian films